Wolfcreek or Wolf Creek is an unincorporated community in Monroe County, West Virginia, United States. Wolfcreek is located on West Virginia Route 3, south of Alderson. Wolfcreek has a post office with ZIP code 24993.

References

Unincorporated communities in Monroe County, West Virginia